Eliza Winston (1830–?) was an enslaved American from Mississippi who was freed from her owners while with them on vacation in Minnesota, a free state. She received a hearing in court via a Freedom suit, where she said she and her late husband had purchased her freedom from a previous owner, but it was not honored. She was freed from her Mississippi owners and possibly aided in getting to Canada, but no definitive account exists for her life afterwards.

Events
In the summer of 1860 Eliza Winston, an enslaved  thirty-year-old woman, was taken to St. Anthony, Minnesota by her owners, Richard and Mary Christmas of Issaquena County, Mississippi.  During that time it was typical for wealthy southern tourists to escape the yellow fever season by traveling via steamboat up the Mississippi River to northern destinations during the summer months.  They took domestic slaves as servants. The Christmases traveled with their five-year-old daughter, Norma, and Winston to the Winslow House in St. Anthony, Minnesota, which was a free state.

Winston had already determined to seek her freedom there and told her story to Ralph and Emily Grey, who were free black citizens. According to her deposition, she and her late husband had previously purchased her freedom, but Ralph Christmas had purchased her from her previous owner, a Mr. Gholson, and did not honor her emancipation. Minnesota was a free state, and Judge Charles Vandenburgh agreed to hear her case. 

The judge sent the sheriff to the Winslow House to take Winston into custody, but by then the Christmas family had moved to a country house on Lake Harriet. When the sheriff arrived, the Christmas family at first hid Winston, but did not resist further when she was located. The following day, after a hearing, the judge ruled that Winston was a free woman. The Saint Anthony Weekly Express opined that the event would damage the tourism trade. That evening, a pro-slavery mob surrounded the Greys' home and demanded that Winston be returned to the Christmases, but with the aid of people in the underground railroad, she was already on her way to Windsor, Ontario Canada, which had abolished slavery, though other accounts of her life exist.  

According to interpretations of the Dred Scott case of 1857, Winston would return to slavery if she returned to a slave state.

See also
 William C. Goodridge, abolitionist father of Emily O. (Goodridge) Grey.

References

1830 births
Year of death missing
19th-century American slaves
Activists for African-American civil rights
African-American abolitionists
People from Issaquena County, Mississippi
History of Minneapolis
Freedom suits in the United States
 19th-century African-American women